The 1958 America's Cup marked the first Cup match sailed in 12-metre class yachts. Twenty years had passed since the last Cup match, held between immense Universal Rule J-class yachts in 1937 besides World War II, and the New York Yacht Club sought a more affordable alternative to restart interest in the Cup. In 1956 Henry Sears led an effort advancing class yachts. The Royal Yacht Squadron of Great Britain agreed to challenge with a new 12-metre, Sceptre. The New York Yacht Club defended with theirs, Columbia, winning the Cup in a four-race sweep.

Defender Series
Four yachts competed in a summer long regatta to determine which the NYYC would name as defender, Columbia (US-16), a new Olin Stephens boat, Weatherly (US-17), Easterner (US-18), and the Olin Stephens designed Vim (US-15) from 1939. Columbia was chosen after a very close set of races resulted in only beating the 19-year-old Vim by 12 seconds in the final competition.

The Races

References

External links
 Columbia article at AC-Cyclopaedia
 Sceptre article at AC-Cyclopaedia
 Current owner of Columbia in Newport, RI
 Sceptre Preservation Society

America's Cup Competitions

1958
A
1958 in American sports
12-metre class